Most American states have made a state fossil designation, in many cases during the 1980s. It is common to designate one species in which fossilization has occurred, rather than a single specimen, or a category of fossils not limited to a single species.

Some states that lack an explicit state fossil have nevertheless singled out a fossil for formal designation as a state dinosaur, rock, gem or stone.


Table of state fossils

States lacking a state fossil 

 Hawaii
 Minnesota
 The giant beaver was proposed in 2022.
 Iowa
 The crinoid was proposed in 2018.
 New Hampshire
 The American mastodon (Mammut americanum) was considered in 2015.
 Rhode Island
 Texas

See also 
 List of U.S. state dinosaurs
 List of U.S. state minerals, rocks, and gemstones
 Lists of U.S. state insignia

References

External links

List of U.S. state fossils, from National Park Service

State
Fossils
United States
Fossils